Antonio Hadzhiivanov (born 16 January 1990 in Blagoevgrad) is a Bulgarian footballer currently playing as a midfielder for Tsarsko Selo Sofia.

Career
A Pirin 2001 youth product, Hadzhiivanov was farmed to Beroe Stara Zagora at A PFG in June 2009. Antonio has made his debut for Beroe in a match against CSKA Sofia on 15 August 2009 as an 81st-minute substitute.

In December 2016, Hadzhiivanov was released by Tsarsko Selo for hitting a team mate during training.

References

External links

1990 births
Living people
Bulgarian footballers
Association football midfielders
First Professional Football League (Bulgaria) players
PFC Beroe Stara Zagora players
FC Pirin Razlog players
OFC Pirin Blagoevgrad players
PFC Lokomotiv Mezdra players
FC Tsarsko Selo Sofia players
Sportspeople from Blagoevgrad